Roger F. Nyhus is a Seattle business and civic leader who is the nominee to be the US Ambassador to Barbados, serving concurrently as the ambassador to Saint Kitts and Nevis, Saint Lucia, Antigua and Barbuda, Dominica, Grenada, and Saint Vincent and the Grenadines

Early life and education
Nyhus earned his bachelor's degree from the Edward R. Murrow College of Communication at Washington State University.

Career
Nyhus is the founder and former CEO of Nyhus Communications, a communications and public affairs firm. based in Seattle, Washington; it is the eighth largest Native American-owned company in the state of Washington. He has participated in international trade missions to China, Ireland, Cuba, and the United Arab Emirates. Nyhus has also served as a trusted adviser to business, government, and nonprofit leaders worldwide, including CEOs of Fortune 500 companies. During his career, Nyhus served as the Communications Director for Washington Governor Gary Locke, a Senior Advocacy Officer for the Bill and Melinda Gates Foundation, and Communications Director for Seattle Mayor Paul Schell. He is an enrolled member of the Chinook Indian Nation, as well as serving on the boards of the Seattle Metropolitan Chamber of Commerce and Downtown Seattle Association.

US Ambassador Nomination
On September 20, 2022, President Joe Biden nominated Nyhus to be the ambassador to Barbados, while also serving as the ambassador to Saint Kitts and Nevis, Saint Lucia, Antigua and Barbuda, Dominica, Grenada, and Saint Vincent and the Grenadines. His nomination was returned to Biden at the end of the Congress on January 3, 2023, as no action was taken on it.

President Biden renominated Nyhus the same day. His nomination is pending before the Senate Foreign Relations Committee.

References

Year of birth missing (living people)
American chief executives
Washington State University alumni